Howard Schultz (October 14, 1953 – December 29, 2014) was an American television producer best known for his long-running  reality series Extreme Makeover. He also produced The Moment of Truth and 72 Hours. His last production was the VH1 reality series Dating Naked. Schultz died in December 2014 while vacationing in Hawaii. He was 61.

References

External links

1953 births
2014 deaths
American television producers